Lucifotychus is a genus of beetles in the family Staphylinidae. There are about 19 described species in Lucifotychus.

Species
These 19 species belong to the genus Lucifotychus:

 Lucifotychus agomphius Grigarick & Schuster, 1962
 Lucifotychus bipuncticeps (Casey, 1887)
 Lucifotychus cognatus (LeConte, 1874)
 Lucifotychus confusus (Chandler, 1983)
 Lucifotychus cornus (Grigarick & Schuster, 1962)
 Lucifotychus dentatus (Grigarick & Schuster, 1962)
 Lucifotychus hirsutus Chandler, 1991
 Lucifotychus impellus Park & Wagner, 1962
 Lucifotychus inornatus Grigarick & Schuster, 1964
 Lucifotychus intellectus (Grigarick & Schuster, 1962)
 Lucifotychus newelli Park & Wagner, 1962
 Lucifotychus plumas (Chandler, 1983)
 Lucifotychus puberulus (LeConte, 1851)
 Lucifotychus quirsfeldi Chandler, 1991
 Lucifotychus remipennis (Grigarick & Schuster, 1962)
 Lucifotychus schuhi (Chandler, 1986)
 Lucifotychus simplicis (Grigarick & Schuster, 1962)
 Lucifotychus stellatus (Grigarick & Schuster, 1962)
 Lucifotychus testaceus (Casey, 1884)

References

Further reading

 
 

Pselaphinae
Articles created by Qbugbot